94.7 Spirit FM (DYMI 94.7 MHz) is an FM station owned and operated by Roman Catholic Archdiocese of Jaro under Global Broadcasting System. Its studios and transmitter are located at Marikudo Hills, Sunshine Valley, Brgy. Simsiman, Calinog, Iloilo.

References

External links
Spirit FM Calinog FB Page

Catholic radio stations
Radio stations in Iloilo City
Radio stations established in 1998